Ray Township may refer to:

Canada 
 Ray township, in Timiskaming District, Ontario

United States 
Ray Township, Franklin County, Indiana
Ray Township, Morgan County, Indiana
Ray Township, Michigan
Ray Township, LaMoure County, North Dakota, in LaMoure County, North Dakota

Township name disambiguation pages